Lillymo Games Inc. is an independent video game developer founded in Guelph, Ontario, Canada by Barry Johnson. Lillymo Games is best known for creating the shoot 'em up series Habroxia and brick breaker game Twin Breaker: A Sacred Symbols Adventure.

Video Games 

Lillymo Games was founded in December 2017 by Barry Johnson, developing his first video game Perils of Baking for the PlayStation 4 and PlayStation Vita, which released in April 2018.

On 11 June 2019, Lillymo Games' released Habroxia on the PlayStation Vita and PlayStation 4, and in March 2020, Lillymo Games released Twin Breaker: A Sacred Symbol Adventure. The game featured characters based on the likeness of podcast and YouTube personalities Colin Moriarty and Chris "Ray Gun" Maldonado, selling 10,000 copies in three months. Moriarty was credited as the game's writer and in June officially joined Lillymo Games as its Chief Creative Officer after acquiring a 49% minority stake in the company. 

Habroxia 2 was released on PlayStation 4, Xbox consoles, Steam, PS Vita and Nintendo Switch in February 2021 to mostly positive reviews.

Super Perils of Baking, a remake of the studio’s first game, was released on PlayStation 4, PlayStation 5, Xbox One, Steam, and Nintendo Switch on June 3 2022, receiving generally favorable reviews.

Support for PlayStation Vita 

Lillymo Games was one of the final developers to support the PlayStation Vita, primarily developing games for the handheld platform before porting them to consoles. On March 29, 2021, IGN and other game industry outlets reported that Sony was closing the PlayStation Store on the Vita, with Johnson revealing that game developers had not been given any notice, forcing them to cancel planned upcoming releases for the Vita. Lillymo Games also revealed Sony had been selling Vita dev kits just one month prior, without any further information about its intentions to close the storefront.

Games developed

References

External links 
 
 
Canadian companies established in 2018
Video game companies of Canada
Video game development companies
Indie video game developers
Software companies of Canada
Video game companies established in 2018